Cosperville is an unincorporated community in Elkhart Township, Noble County, in the U.S. state of Indiana.

History
Cosperville was originally known as Springfield, and under the latter name was founded in 1844. A post office was established at Cosperville in 1891, and remained in operation until it was discontinued in 1903.

Geography

References

Unincorporated communities in Noble County, Indiana
Unincorporated communities in Indiana